This is a list of Annie Awards ceremonies, the date of the ceremony, the year in film they were honoring, their hosts, and the Best Animated Feature.

Venues
The venues for the Annie Awards ceremonies have been:
1972: Sportsmen's Lodge, Studio City, California
1973–1987: Unknown
1988: Universal Studios Hitchcock Theater
1989-1991: Unknown
1992–1995: Academy of Television Arts and Sciences Plaza Theatre
1996–1997: Pasadena Civic Auditorium
1998–2007: Alex Theatre
2008–Present: Royce Hall

Ceremonies

1st – 1972 – hosted by Grim Natwick
2nd – 1973 - hosted by Mel Blanc
3rd – 1974 - hosted by Roger Ebert
4th – 1975 - hosted by Sherman Brothers 
5th – 1976 - hosted by Woody Allen
6th – 1977 - hosted by Henry Gibson
7th – 1978 - hosted by Jo Anne Worley
8th – 1979 - hosted by Lily Tomlin and Richard Dawson
9th – 1980 - hosted by Paul Winchell
10th – 1981 - hosted by Casey Kasem
11th – 1982 - hosted by Eartha Kitt
12th – 1983 - hosted by Ken Sansom
13th – 1984 - hosted by Phil Harris and Brock Peters
14th – 1985 - hosted by David Ogden Stiers
15th – 1986 - hosted by Michael J. Fox
16th – 1987 - hosted by Steven Bednarski
17th – 1988 - hosted by June Foray
18th – 1990 - hosted by Robin Williams
19th – 1991 - hosted by Christopher Plummer

*Record holder for most Annie Awards received in a single year

References

External links
Annie Awards Homepage
IMDb: Annie Awards

Annie Awards
Annie